Benjamin Franklin Wilson was an American politician from the U.S. state of Oklahoma. He was a member of the 1st Oklahoma Legislature and served as the second Speaker of the Oklahoma House of Representatives.

Early life
Born in 1855, in Texas to John Wilson Jr. and Emily Brown. He later married Jenny Horne.  Prior to his election, he was an alfalfa farmer.

Political career
Wilson was among Oklahoma's first class of state legislators, serving in the 1st Oklahoma Legislature in the Oklahoma House of Representatives. The state legislature met from December 2, 1907, to May 26, 1908, in the Guthrie City Hall Building during the first year of the only term of Governor Charles N. Haskell.

He served as the second Speaker of the Oklahoma House of Representatives, during the 2nd Oklahoma Legislature. At the time, he hailed from a town known as Cereal, which today is known as Banner, Oklahoma.

Later life and death
Benjamin continued to live in Oklahoma, enumerated in the 1920 census in Canadian County, and 1930 census for Oklahoma County. Benjamin's wife, Jennie, died November 27, 1925 of chronic nephritis. Benjamin Franklin Wilson died April 25, 1934 of heart disease. And was buried at Fairlawn Cemetery in Oklahoma City, Oklahoma County, Oklahoma

References

1851 births
1937 deaths
People of Indian Territory
Speakers of the Oklahoma House of Representatives
Democratic Party members of the Oklahoma House of Representatives
20th-century American politicians